Wales is a town in Hampden County, Massachusetts, United States. The population was 1,838 at the 2020 census. It is part of the Springfield, Massachusetts Metropolitan Statistical Area.

History 

Wales was first settled by Europeans in 1726 and was officially incorporated on August 23, 1775, as "South Brimfield," a name it kept until February 20, 1828. The town was renamed after James Lawrence Wales, a local benefactor. Initial settlers included Anthony Needham, John Bullen, and Samuel and Dorothy Munger. The next generation of Mungers became prominent in the town. Samuel (Jr.) served as a selectman and was deacon of the Baptist Church for many years. Nathaniel was one of 12 men of the district appointed as a "court of Justice and Honor to determine all controversies that may hereafter arise in said District," and was also a deacon of the Baptist Church. The "Meadow District" of Wales was originally known as "Munger's Meadow" and includes graves of early pioneers.

Geography
Wales is in southeastern Hampden County and is bounded on the west by Monson; on the south by Stafford and Union, Connecticut; on the east by Holland; and on the north by Brimfield.

Massachusetts Route 19 crosses the town, leading north  to the center of Brimfield and south  (via Connecticut Route 19) to Stafford Springs, Connecticut.

Education

Wales Elementary School, serving grades K–6, has its own school committee, part of School Union 61. Wales students attend Tantasqua Regional Junior High School (grades 7–8) and Tantasqua Regional High School in Sturbridge. Union 61 and the Tantasqua district share administrators, including the superintendent, and both include Brimfield, Brookfield, Holland, Sturbridge and Wales.

Library

The Wales Public Library opened in 1897. In fiscal year 2008, the town of Wales spent 1.28% ($45,480) of its budget on its public library—approximately $24 per person, per year ($31.63 adjusted for inflation to 2022).

Demographics
By the 2010 census, the population had reached 1,838.

As of the census of 2000, there had been 1,737 people, 660 households, and 481 families residing in the town. The racial makeup of the town was 97.75% White, 0.52% African American, 0.29% Native American, 0.17% Asian, 0.35% from other races, and 0.92% from two or more races. Hispanic or Latino of any race were 0.63% of the population.There were 660 households, out of which 33.5% had children under the age of 18 living with them, 57.4% were married couples living together, and 11.1% had a female head of household with no husband present.

The median income for a household in the town was $48,906, and the median income for a family was $51,629. Males had a median income of $39,766 versus $27,557 for females. The per capita income for the town was $21,267. About 1.8% of families and 3.5% of the population were below the poverty line, including 3.2% of those under age 18 and 3.9% of those age 65 or over.

References

External links
Town of Wales official website

Towns in Hampden County, Massachusetts
Springfield metropolitan area, Massachusetts
Towns in Massachusetts